is an international chain of cream puff stores started in Japan, owned by . Their slogan is "Fresh and natural cream puffs". Beard Papa's has over 250 stores in Japan, and over 400 worldwide in 15 countries and territories.

Their trademark product is a choux pastry shell filled with whipped cream custard, available in vanilla, chocolate, and specialty flavors such as green tea, strawberry, Nutella, Blueberry, Limoncello, coconut creme, Black Sesame, Cheese, Almond cream, Azuki bean, Pineapple, Matcha Azuki, Durian, Apple Cinnamon, Hazelnut, Cookie and Creme, Key Lime Pie, Banana, Piña Colada, Dulce de leche, mango, pumpkin, S'more, Earl Grey tea, éclair, Honey Butter, Espresso and coffee. In addition, the Hawaiian location (Ala Moana) also has haupia, lilikoi, Baileys Irish Cream, Mint Chocolate, Raspberry Chocolate, Red Velvet Cake and caramel flavors. The Riyadh, Saudi Arabia location also has Cinnamon, Dates and Pistachio flavors. The different flavors are sold on a rotating schedule.

History
The first Beard Papa's was opened in 1999 by Yuji Hirota in Osaka, Japan with the motto Pipin' Hot Cream Puffs. Since its beginnings, Beard Papa's has grown considerably expanding outside of Osaka and Japan to Australia, Canada, China, Hong Kong, Indonesia, Korea, Malaysia, New Zealand, Pakistan, the Philippines, Singapore, Taiwan, Thailand, Sri Lanka, the United Kingdom, the United Arab Emirates, the United States, and Vietnam.

The company opened a flagship outlet, its first in Europe, in London's Oxford Street in December 2006. This closed in 2010.

In June 2008, Beard Papa's was ranked "Wired" by Wired Magazine, the magazine's highest rating, above "Tired" and "Expired".

The Beard Papa character appeared in the 2012 Disney animated film Wreck-It Ralph and was voiced by John DiMaggio.

Other pastries and desserts

Beard Papa's has a selection of other pastries and desserts such as:
Macarons
Mochi Ice Cream
Fondant Au Chocolat
Mango Ice Shower
Cheesecake
Mont-Blanc
Tiramisu

References

External links

 Muginoho official website 
 Beard Papa's North American site 

Fast-food chains of Japan
Fast-food chains of the United States
Restaurants established in 1999
1999 establishments in Japan